In the 1982–83 season, EP Sétif was competing in the National 1 for the 19th time, as well as the Algerian Cup. It was their 19th consecutive season in the top flight of Algerian football. They competed in National 1 and the Algerian Cup.

Squad list
Players and squad numbers last updated on 1 September 1982.Note: Flags indicate national team as has been defined under FIFA eligibility rules. Players may hold more than one non-FIFA nationality.

Competitions

Overview

National 1

League table

Results by round

Matches

Algerian Cup

Squad information

Appearances and goals
Only 23 games from 30 in National appearances

|-

Goalscorers
Includes all competitive matches. The list is sorted alphabetically by surname when total goals are equal.

References

External links
 Algeria 1982/83 season at rsssf.com 
 1982–83 EP Sétif season at footballvintage.net 

ES Sétif seasons
Algerian football clubs 1982–83 season